Stinking Bishop may refer to:

 Stinking Bishop (pear), a variety of pear 
 Stinking Bishop (cheese), a cheese